Freeburg is an unincorporated community in Houston County, in the U.S. state of Minnesota.

History
A post office was established at Freeburg in 1858, and remained in operation until it was discontinued in 1947. The community was originally built up chiefly by Germans, who named it after the city of Freiburg, Germany.

References

Unincorporated communities in Houston County, Minnesota
Unincorporated communities in Minnesota